Mount Yuntai may refer to:

 Mount Yuntai (Matsu), a mountain in Taiwan
 Yuntai Mountain (Henan), a mountain in Henan